Swertia punicea is a plant species in the genus Swertia.

The xanthonoids methylswertianin and bellidifolin can be isolated from S. punicea.

References

External links

punicea